Stephen Patrick DeMaine Kelly (born November 21, 1994 in Lutherville, Maryland) is an American lacrosse player who plays for Cannons Lacrosse Club of the Premier Lacrosse League (PLL). Kelly plays as a midfielder and face-off specialist and scored the first goal in PLL history in 2019. Kelly was selected to play in the 2021 PLL All Star Game in San Jose, California.

Prior to joining the Archers, Kelly played for the Chesapeake Bayhawks in the Major League Lacrosse (MLL). He was selected to the MLL All-Star Team in 2018, and helped lead them to an overtime victory over Team USA.

Kelly attended University of North Carolina, Chapel Hill (UNC) from 2014 to 2017 where he played college lacrosse. In 2016, Kelly was named co-MVP of the National Championship team and was awarded the Turnbull Trophy. In 2017, Kelly was named team captain and helped lead UNC to an ACC Championship. Kelly is ranked 2nd in all-time face-off wins (718) and 3rd in all-time most ground balls (378) at UNC.

Kelly played high school lacrosse at Calvert Hall College High School where he was a two-time high school All-American and helped lead Calvert Hall to an MIAA championship in 2012. He was the youngest member of the 2012 USA Under 19 Lacrosse Team, helping the team win the gold medal at the FIL World Championship in Turku, Finland.

Bio

Early years
Stephen Kelly was born at the Greater Baltimore Medical Center in Baltimore, Maryland, to Gayle and Frank Kelly III. He started playing lacrosse at age 6 at the Lutherville-Timonium Rec Council (LTRC). Kelly also played for the Fellowship of Christian Athletes (FCA) National Team which won the 2009 US Lacrosse U15 National Championship and he was named to the All-Tournament Team. Kelly continued playing lacrosse at Calvert Hall College High School, where he was a four-year letterman playing as a midfielder and face-off specialist. He was named team captain his Senior year.

Kelly also captained the football team at Calvert Hall where he was a three-year starter. He helped lead the team to their first football championship in 28 years. Kelly was named first-team All-MIAA as a running back and All-State as a defensive back in 2012.

College career 
Kelly played college lacrosse at UNC where he was a four-year starter at face-off and team captain his senior year. Kelly was awarded the Holmes Harden Sr. Memorial Award all four years for leading the team in ground balls and was a two-time All-American. He ranks second in all time faceoff wins and third in all-time most ground balls in UNC Lacrosse history.

Professional career

MLL - Chesapeake Bayhawks 
Stephen Kelly was one of the six UNC players to be selected in the MLL Draft as a sixth round draft pick (#48) Midfielder/Face-off Specialist for the Bayhawks in 2017. Kelly was selected to play in the 2018 MLL All-Star game against Team USA.

PLL - Archers 
On March 4, 2019 the PLL released their six team roster with Stephen Kelly as one of the Archer's Face-off Specialist. Kelly quickly made history on the League opening game (June 1, 2019 at Gillette Stadium in Foxborough, Massachusetts) against the Chrome Lacrosse Club winning the first face-off, first ground ball, and scoring the first goal in PLL history eleven seconds into the game.

He currently ranks (July 2019) third in League History for Ground Balls.

Cannons 
Kelly was traded to Cannons Lacrosse Club, along with Archers' third round pick in the 2022 PLL College Draft, in exchange for Cannons' third and fourth round picks in the same draft.

Career statistics

Collegiate

MLL

PLL

Awards and honors

High school lacrosse 
 4 year letterman: midfielder and face-off specialist
 2013 Under Amour All-American
Inside Lacrosse Magazine: No. 2 ranked No. 1 midfielder in class of 2013
 U.S. Lacrosse high school All- American: 2012, 2013
 C. Markland Kelly Award Finalist: top Male Lacrosse player in the MIAA (Maryland Interscholastic Athletic Association)
 Baltimore Sun first-team All-Metro honors: 2011, 2012, 2013
 First-team All-MIAA: 2011, 2012, 2013
 Towson Times Co-Player of the year: 2012, 2013
 Team captain: 2013
 MIAA “A” Conference Championship game: 2011, 2012
 2012 USA Under 19 Lacrosse Team – FIL World Champion Turku, Finland – Gold Medalist

High school football 
 Three-year starter
 Team captain (2012)
 First-Team All-MIAA running back
 All-State defensive back: 2012
 Baltimore Sun High School Athlete of the Year finalist (2012 and 2013)
 McMullen Scholar
 Nation Honor Society: 4.0 Cumulative GPA
 Spanish National Honor Society
 FCA (Fellowship of Christian Athletes) Huddle: 4-year captain

Collegiate lacrosse

Freshman year 2014
 Holmes Harden, Sr., Memorial Award - Ground Ball Leader
 ACC Academic honor roll
 Carolina Leadership Academy Rising Star

Sophomore year 2015
 Holmes Harden, Sr., Memorial Award – Ground Ball Leader
 All-ACC Academic Team
 ACC Player of the Week
 March 30, 2015

Junior year 2016
 UNC Turnbull Trophy winner as co-MVP of team
 USILA All-America Honorable mention 
 First Team All-ACC Team
 All-ACC Team – face-off specialist
 All-ACC Academic Team
 Holmes Harden, Sr., Memorial Award – Ground Ball Leader
 ACC Defensive Player of the Week 
 February 29, 2016
 March 21, 2016
 April 25, 2016
Baltimore Sun National Player of the Week
 April 28, 2016

Senior year 2017
 USILA Scholar All–American Team
 All-ACC Academic team
 ACC Player of the Week:
 February 6, 2017
 April 11, 2017
 Holmes Harden, Sr., Memorial Award – Ground Ball Leader
 Inside Lacrosse All-American Team Honorable Mention
 Team Face-off Yearbook Preseason 3rd All-America Selection
 Tewaaraton Trophy Watch List

Personal info 
Stephen Kelly graduated UNC with a degree in Business Administration. Kelly currently lives in Atlanta, Georgia working as a Director of Corporate Development at OneDigital Health and Benefits. He is a co-owner of k-2 Lacrosse Training with his brother, Frankie Kelly. Some of his interests outside of lacrosse are golf, tennis and hiking. Kelly has 3 siblings; Frankie IV, Jackie Lee, and JK. He married Caroline Dilli in 2021.

References 

1994 births
Living people
Premier Lacrosse League players
North Carolina Tar Heels men's lacrosse players
Major League Lacrosse players
People from Lutherville, Maryland
University of North Carolina at Chapel Hill alumni
Calvert Hall College High School alumni
Sportspeople from Baltimore County, Maryland
Chesapeake Bayhawks players